Pimelea plurinervia is a species of flowering plant in the family Thymelaeaceae and is endemic to north-eastern Queensland. It is a shrub with densely hairy young stems, elliptic leaves and heads of 24 to 45 white, tube-shaped flowers.

Description
The upper surface of the leaves is sometimes hairy, the lower surface with hairs pressed against the surface.

Taxonomy
Pimelea plurinervia  was first formally described in 2017 by Anthony Bean in the journal Austrobaileya from specimens he collected in Hinchinbrook Island National Park in 1991. The specific epithet (plurinervia) means "many veins", referring to the veins on the leaves.

Distribution and habitat
This pimelea grows in wet forest and on the edges of rainforest on Hinchinbrook Island and nearby mainland areas, and near Tully Falls south of Ravenshoe.

References

plurinervia
Flora of Queensland
Malvales of Australia
Plants described in 2017
Taxa named by Anthony Bean